Murugaiyan may refer to:

K. Murugaiyan, Indian communist politician
P. Murugaiyan, Indian politician and former Member of the Legislative Assembly of Tamil Nadu
S. Murugaiyan, Indian politician and former Member of the Legislative Assembly of Tamil Nadu
S.G. Murugaiyan, Indian communist politician in Tamil Nadu